The 2014 Eastern Illinois Panthers football team represented Eastern Illinois University as a member of the Ohio Valley Conference (OVC) during the 2014 NCAA Division I FCS football season. Led by first-year head coach Kim Dameron, the Panthers compiled an overall record of 5–7 overall with a mark of 5–3 in conference play, tying for third place in the OVC. Eastern Illinois played home games at O'Brien Field in Charleston, Illinois.

Schedule

Ranking movements

References

Eastern Illinois
Eastern Illinois Panthers football seasons
Eastern Illinois Panthers football